= CPEIR =

CPEIR (Climate Public Expenditure and Institutional Review) is a tool to review and assess public expenditures and climate change. CPEIR also assesses the public agencies, development partners and CSOs that are involved in climate change finance.

CPEIR was first introduced in Nepal in 2011 with support from UNDP. It was then rolled-out in many countries in the Asia-Pacific region, and then Africa and Latin America. As of the June 2015, there were 19 Asian countries in Asia, nine Africa countries and six Latin American countries using CPEIRs.

Other development partners (e.g. the World Bank) also supported these initiatives. In most of the countries CPEIR was done at the level of state/federal budget. However, a few countries used CPEIR at the sub-national level (e.g. Pakistan).

CPEIR countries, as of June 2015.

Asia	Africa	Latin America	Europe
Bangladesh	Ethiopia	Chile	Armenia
Cambodia	Kenya	Colombia	
China	Mozambique	El Salvador	
Fiji	Uganda	Honduras	
Indonesia		Nicaragua	
Kiribati			
Nauru			
Nepal			
Pakistan			
Philippines			
Samoa			
Thailand			
Vietnam			

CPEIR methodology is generally based on the World Bank's Public Expenditures Review (PER) exercise. However, unlike the PERs, the CPEIR process also analyzes the institutional framework of climate change public finance. This add-on to the standard PER process is due to the cross-cutting nature of climate change related finances.

This cross-cutting nature also impacts the review process. In the typical PER, the data on public expenditures is generally easy to obtain, requiring relatively low efforts to obtain the required general financial data on planned and actual government budget expenditures. However, the climate change expenditures are not explicitly recorded by the government statistics systems (such as the GFS classifications).

In contrast to PER, CPEIR processes spend most of the efforts on gathering and triangulation of the financial data on climate change expenditures. This additional step provides information that governments do not possess themselves, despite the fact that CPEIRs mostly use the raw government data on budgets.

Despite CPEIR's significant added value to the knowledge on climate change-related expenditures, the data gathering challenge brings additional disadvantage. CPEIRs pay less attention to the effectiveness and efficiency of the public expenditures compared to the PERs. This is not an embedded characteristics of CPEIRs but an evolutionary/transitional challenge of CPEIRs which may positively change over time.

The most reliable and systematic information on CPEIRs is collected by UNDP Asia-Pacific Regional Centre (UNDP Bangkok Regional Hub) and published online. The database on CPEIRs is also available online.

UNDP also conducted a review of the CPEIR process lessons learnt in November 2012.
